Timothy Cathalina (born 24 January 1985) is a former professional footballer from Curaçao who played as a right-back.

Career
Born in Willemstad, Curaçao, in the former Netherlands Antilles, Cathalina played youth football with FC Twente but began his professional career in 2005 with AGOVV Apeldoorn, making over 100 appearances, before moving to FC Emmen in 2009.

On 27 January 2010, Cathalina played on trial for Grimsby Town in a behind-closed-doors friendly against Hull City at Blundell Park. On 4 June 2010, he signed a one-year deal with Tranmere Rovers following a two-week trial towards the end of the 2009–10 season. In April 2011 his contract was cancelled by the club through mutual consent to allow him to look for an alternative club before the summer break.

In July 2011 Cathalina returned to Netherlands signing with SV Spakenburg.

References
General
 Voetbal International

Specific

1985 births
Living people
People from Willemstad
Curaçao footballers
Dutch footballers
Dutch Antillean footballers
Association football fullbacks
Eerste Divisie players
AGOVV Apeldoorn players
FC Emmen players
Tranmere Rovers F.C. players
SV Spakenburg players
Dutch expatriate footballers
Dutch expatriate sportspeople in England
Expatriate footballers in England